Sulitjelma may refer to:

Places
Sulitjelma, a village in Fauske municipality in Nordland county, Norway
Sulitjelma (mountain), a mountain massif in Fauske municipality in Nordland county, Norway
Sulitjelma Glacier, a glacier in Norway and Sweden
Sulitjelma Chapel, a chapel in Fauske municipality in Nordland county, Norway
Sulitjelma Church, a church in Fauske municipality in Nordland county, Norway
Sulitjelma Hotel, a hotel in Fauske municipality in Nordland county, Norway

Other
Sulitjelma Mines, a defunct mining company based in Fauske municipality in Nordland county, Norway
Sulitjelma Line, a former railway line in Fauske municipality in Nordland county, Norway